Zastava M59/66 PAP, also known as papovka, is a Yugoslav licensed version of Soviet SKS semi-automatic rifle. The nickname "papovka" is a derived from PAP, the abbreviation for poluautomatska puška, Serbian for "semi-automatic rifle".

History

Development 

Yugoslavia's defense industry started planning the development and production of a new self-loading rifle design during the 1950s, namely to replace the bolt-action Zastava M48 then in service with the Yugoslav People's Army. In 1959, Yugoslavia acquired the rights to manufacture the Soviet SKS semi-automatic carbine under license. Limited production of the SKS commenced in 1961 at Preduzeće 44 (Enterprise Facility 44), which was a successor to the former Yugoslav Military Technical Institute in Kragujevac and had undergone an unprecedented expansion in 1953 to better accommodate mass production of various weapons. Aside from this preliminary production run, however, no SKS carbines were produced at the Kragujevac facility again until 1964, when the weapon type finally entered serialized mass production. The earliest examples of the SKS manufactured in Kragujevac under the auspices of Zastava received the designation M59 PAP and initially resembled late Soviet pattern carbines, albeit without the chrome-lined barrels characteristic to the latter. However, the weapon's design had been much more heavily modified by 1966 and most subsequent examples were known as the M59/66 PAP.

Service 
The M59/66 remained in service with military and security forces in Yugoslavia until the dissolution of that country in 1991, although by that time it had been largely superseded by the M70 assault rifle, a Yugoslav derivative of the Soviet AK-47. Due to the availability of surplus M70s and other Kalashnikov-pattern rifles during the Yugoslav Wars, the M59/66 vanished from active service in Yugoslavia's various successor states during the 1990s.

During the South African Border War, the People's Liberation Army of Namibia (PLAN) received an unknown number of M59/66s and 22mm M60 rifle grenades, also of Yugoslav origin, as military aid. Even in the southern African theater, the weapon's basic design was considered quite dated by the peak of the war in the 1980s; however, PLAN retained the M59/66 due to its lack of equivalent weapons capable of launching rifle grenades. PLAN insurgents made effective use of rifle grenades fired from M59/66s against light armoured South African military vehicles, namely the Casspir. The insurgents loaded their M59/66s with the M60 anti-tank variant as well as the more slender M60 AP1 anti-personnel rifle grenade. They frequently sprang ambushes of South African military or police columns by attempting to disable the lead vehicle with an M60, either targeting the engine block or the wheels. By the end of the war, each PLAN section included at least one insurgent armed with an M59/66, and another with an RPG-7. Larger PLAN units included an equal number of insurgents armed with M59/66s and RPGs, with each carrying at least three rifle grenades or five PG-7 projectiles, respectively.

Description 

The Zastava M59/66 PAP is identical in function and operation to the Soviet SKS in nearly every respect, except its ability to launch 22mm rifle grenades from an integral grenade launcher spigot mounted at the front of the barrel. The rifle has been fitted with a folding ladder sight for use in launching grenades. This sight is normally locked into a folded position atop the gas block. Prior to firing a rifle grenade, the sight is unlocked by depressing a switch on the gas port. This action also closes off the gas port in the barrel, which prevents the semi-automatic action from being cycled while a grenade is being launched. The sight ladder may then be raised and locked into the vertical position. 

The M59/66 was fitted with an unusual bayonet mount which also doubled as the mount for the front sight and the folding grenade launcher sight. The original Soviet blade bayonet as standard to the SKS had to be replaced by a unique Yugoslav bayonet to accommodate the new mount placement.

A commercial variant of the M59 and M59/66 series, available for sale to civilians in some of the post-Yugoslav republics, lacked the bayonet or the ability to fire rifle grenades.

Users

Current users 
 
  - used by Honour Guard of Armed Forces of Bosnia and Herzegovina
  - used by Honour Unit of Ministry of Interior of Republika Srpska  
  - used by Croatian Honour Guard
  - Used by Honour Guard Company
  - used by the Ceremonial Guard Battalion
  - used by Serbian Guards Unit 
  - used by Slovenian Guards Unit

Former users 
 
  People's Liberation Army of Namibia
  - used by Yugoslav People's Army; it was standard military rifle since the middle 1960s before it was replaced by Zastava M70 in the early 1980s

References 

Zastava Arms
7.62×39mm semi-automatic rifles
Rifles of Yugoslavia
Military equipment introduced in the 1960s